Divine Songs may refer to:

Divine Songs, common name for Divine Songs Attempted in Easy Language for the Use of Children by Isaac Watts
Divine Songs (Swamini Turiyasangitananda album), by the artist formerly known as Alice Coltrane